The following is a list of events affecting Pakistani television in 2016. Events listed include television show debuts, and finales; channel launches, and closures; stations changing or adding their network affiliations; and information about changes of ownership of channels or stations.

Television programs

Programs debuting in 2016

Programs ending in 2016

Hum TV
Aik Thi Misaal (12 January 2016)
Tumhare Siwa (15 January 2016)
Tere Baghair (28 January 2016)
Sangat (4 February 2016)
Mera Dard Na Janay Koi (18 February 2016)
Preet Na Kariyo Koi (8 March 2016)
Ishq-e-Benaam (29 March 2016)
Gul-e-Rana (2 April 2016)
Maana Ka Gharana (6 April 2016)
Maan (6 May 2016)
Sehra Main Safar (27 May 2016)
Joru Ka Ghulam (29 May 2016)
Tere Mere Beech (29 May 2016)
Abro (4 June 2016)

ARY Digital
Mere Ajnabi (20 January 2016)
Aitraz (4 March 2016)
Vasl-e-Yaar (7 March 2016)
Batashay (2 April 2016)
Naraaz (26 April 2016)
Guzaarish (3 May 2016)
Bay Qasoor (1 June 2016)
Mohay Piya Rang Laaga (13 June 2016)
Ab Kar Meri Rafugari (14 July 2016)
Guriya Rani (21 July 2016)

Geo Entertainment
Mujhe Kuch Kehna Hai (11 February 2016)
Marzi (Geo TV)
Joru Ka Ghulam (Geo TV)

References